Juan Carlos Reyes Braun (born 15 October 1976) is a Uruguayan former footballer, who last played for Juventud Independiente. He participated in the third season of Bailando por un Sueño El Salvador.

Honours

Playing

Club
Once Municipal
 Primera División 
 Champion: Apertura 2006
Copa Presidente
 Champion: 2006-2007

Juventud Independiente
 Segunda División
 Champion: 2011

References

External links
 Juan Carlos Reyes at playmakerstats.com (English version of ceroacero.es)

1976 births
Living people
Uruguayan footballers
Club Nacional de Football players
Centro Atlético Fénix players
Tacuarembó F.C. players
A.D. Isidro Metapán footballers
C.D. Luis Ángel Firpo footballers
Once Municipal footballers
Nejapa footballers
Atlético Balboa footballers
C.D. Juventud Independiente players
Expatriate footballers in El Salvador
Uruguayan expatriate sportspeople in El Salvador
Association football forwards
Footballers from Paysandú